Ricky Fajrin Saputra (born 6 September 1995) is an Indonesian professional footballer who plays as a left-back for Liga 1 club Bali United.

Club career 
Ricky started his career by joining Berlian Rajawali in Liga Nusantara. On 13 January 2015, he signed a contract with Bali United to commence ahead of the 2015 Indonesia Super League. He made his debut on 4 April 2015, as starting line-up, which ended 2–1 defeat against Perseru Serui.

International career 
Ricky has represented Indonesia under-19 in 2014 AFC U-19 Championship.

He made his international debut for senior team on 21 March 2017, against Myanmar.

Career statistics

Club

International

International goals
International under-23 goals

Honours

Club
Bali United
 Liga 1: 2019, 2021–22

International 
Indonesia U-23
 Southeast Asian Games  Bronze medal: 2017
Indonesia
 Aceh World Solidarity Cup runner-up: 2017

Individual
 Liga 1 Team of the Season: 2019 (Substitutes)
 APPI Indonesian Football Award Best 11: 2021–22 '''

References

External links 
 
 

1995 births
Living people
Indonesian footballers
Liga 1 (Indonesia) players
Bali United F.C. players
People from Semarang
Sportspeople from Central Java
Indonesia youth international footballers
Indonesia international footballers
Association football fullbacks
Southeast Asian Games bronze medalists for Indonesia
Southeast Asian Games medalists in football
Association football central defenders
Footballers at the 2018 Asian Games
Competitors at the 2017 Southeast Asian Games
Asian Games competitors for Indonesia